Rimba (Irimba) is the speech variety of the Babongo-Rimba pygmies of Gabon. Generally considered a dialect of Punu, it may preserve a core of non-Bantu vocabulary, and so to be conservative should be considered unclassified.

References

 "Towards a new classification of African languages", Linguistic Contribution to the History of Sub-Saharan Africa, University of Lyons

Languages of Gabon
Unclassified languages of Africa